Falsifiers of History was a book published by the Soviet Information Bureau, edited and partially re-written by Joseph Stalin, in response to documents made public in January 1948 regarding German–Soviet relations before and after the Molotov–Ribbentrop Pact.

Background on Nazi–Soviet Relations documents
In 1948, the U.S. State Department published a collection of documents titled Nazi–Soviet Relations, 1939–1941: Documents from the Archives of The German Foreign Office, which contained documents recovered from the Foreign Office of Nazi Germany. The collection included documents from, and about conversations with, Soviet officials during negotiations regarding the Molotov–Ribbentrop Pact, a 1939 agreement between the Soviet Union and Germany, along with the related 1939 German–Soviet Commercial Agreement.  It also included publication of the "Secret Additional Protocol" of that Pact, which divided eastern Europe into "spheres of influence" between Germany and the Soviet Union, executed weeks before each country's subsequent invasion of Poland.  The collection further contained "Secret Supplementary Protocols" to agreements between the countries, discussions regarding the 1940 German–Soviet Commercial Agreement, discussions of the Soviet Union potentially becoming an Axis Power and other German–Soviet negotiations and discussions.

Publication
Falsifiers was published in response to the documents made public in Nazi–Soviet Relations.  Joseph Stalin became personally involved in editing the work after receiving a translation of the Nazi–Soviet Relations document collection.  On February 3, 1948, Stalin was presented with a typescript titled Reply to Slanderers.  Stalin changed the title to Falsifiers of History (Historical Reports).  Stalin personally edited the book, including striking and re-writing whole sections by handwritten modification.

Falsifiers originally appeared as a series of articles in Pravda in February 1948.  It was subsequently published in numerous languages and distributed worldwide.  Separately, the Soviet Union later published a collection of documents it captured from German archives titled Documents and Materials Relating to the Eve of the Second World War.

Themes and issues
Falsifiers pointedly ignored Soviet relations with Germany, making no attempt to directly counter or deal with the documents published in Nazi–Soviet Relations. Rather, the main theme of the booklet is Western culpability for the outbreak of war in 1939. It argues that "Western powers" aided Nazi rearmament and aggression, including that American bankers and industrialists provided capital for the growth of German war industries, while deliberately encouraging Hitler to expand eastward.  It depicted the Soviet Union as striving to negotiate a collective security against Hitler, while being thwarted by double-dealing Anglo–French appeasers who, despite appearances, had no intention of a Soviet alliance and were secretly negotiating with Berlin.

Falsifiers casts the Munich agreement, not just as Anglo–French short-sightedness or cowardice, but as a "secret" agreement that was "a highly important phase in their policy aimed at goading the Hitlerite aggressors against the Soviet Union." Falsifiers also included the claim that during the Pact's operation Stalin rejected Hitler's offer to divide the world, without mentioning the Soviet counteroffer to Germany's offer to the Soviets to join the Axis.  The parties never reached agreement on Axis entry.  Stalin's account in Falsifiers was repeated in Soviet historical texts until the Soviet Union's dissolution. Regarding Soviet–German relations after the Molotov–Ribbentrop Pact, Falsifiers main theme frames Soviet actions as a legitimate attempt to build up an "Eastern front" to defend against inevitable Nazi aggression.

Falisifiers characterization of Western policy as anti-Communist, anti-Soviet, and pro-Nazi had been a prominent theme of Soviet propaganda before the Second World War, and such rhetoric more vigorously reemerged during the Cold War.

Importance
Soviet publications before the revelation of documents in Nazi–Soviet Relations had avoided discussing the Soviet–German pact.  Accordingly, Falsifiers is novel because it is a first frank Soviet discussion of the German–Soviet pact in a publication.  In addition, because Falsifiers was personally and extensively edited by Stalin, at the very least, it provides unique insight into the view of events that he was keen to publicize.

The book provides insight into Stalin's thinking and calculations in the autumn of 1940.  In analyzing the text of Falsifiers surrounding Soviet–German talks regarding the potential entry as the Soviet Union as an Axis Power, historian Geoffrey Roberts argues that there is no reason that Stalin would not have signed a four-power pact if Germany accepted his November offer.

Contents

Chapters and sections
The arrangement of chapters and section titles is as follows:

Introduction
Documents Captured in Germany
A Distorted Picture of Events
Chapter 1: How Preparation for German Aggression Was Commenced
Dawes Reparation Plan
A Share In The Profits
The Golden Rain Of American Dollars
Factors Which Helped To Unleash Hitler Aggression
A Soviet Union Alone Pursued A Policy of Peace
The Soviet Principle of Collective Security
Western Powers Rejection Of Collective Security Pact
Chapter 2: Not a Struggle Against German Aggression, But A Policy Of Isolating the U.S.S.R.
Hitler-Halifax Conversation
Hitler's Annexationist Actions Were Encouraged
The Soviet Union's Warning
The Munich Deal
The True Meaning Of Munich
Handing Over Czechoslovakia to Hitler
"Uniting Europe Without Russia"
Chapter 3: Isolation of the Soviet Union: The Soviet–German Non-Aggression Pact
Negotiations Between Britain and France And The Soviet Union
A Position of Inequality For The USSR
No Obligations Whatever Towards the USSR
The Soviet Proposal
Spurring Hitler To Attack the U.S.S.R
Military Negotiation Also Futile
Britain's Back-Stage Negotiation With Germany
Surrender of Poland To Hitler
U.S.S.R.'s Non-Aggression Pact With Germany
The Best Possible Course
Chapter 4: Creation of the "Eastern Front".  Germany's Attack on the U.S.S.R., The Anti-Hitler Coalition And The Question of Inter-Allied Obligations
Creation Of The Eastern Front
Finnish Government Declines Soviet Union's Friendly Proposal
Safeguarding Security of Leningrad, Murmansk
Britain and France Supply Finland With Arms
A Plan For Military Operations Against the U.S.S.R.
A Turn In the Development Of The War
Fiasco of Policy of Appeasement
Germany Attacks the U.S.S.R.
The Anti-Hitler Coalition
What Actually Happened in Berlin!
Sounding The Position Of The Hitler Government
Negotiations Between U.S.A. and Germany in 1943
Postponing the Opening of the Second Front
U.S.S.R.'s Assistance To Its Ally
J. V. Stalin's Message to Winston Churchill On Preparation of Offensive
A Blow of Unparalleled Force

Statements responding to then Cold War issues

Notes

References

External links 
 Falsificators of history, an historical note; text of communique issued February, 1948 - page images of the original pamphlet issued by the Soviet embassy in Washington.

1948 non-fiction books
Works by Joseph Stalin
Historical negationism
Soviet propaganda books
Works about the Cold War
Cold War
Foreign relations of the Soviet Union
Germany–Soviet Union relations